Child's Play is a 1954 British science fiction film, which was made in 1952.

Plot
It is a science-fiction film about children who manage to split the atom and thereby create a new form of popcorn. Directed by Margaret Thomson, it was based on a script by Don Sharp, who also worked on the film as an assistant.

Cast

 Mona Washbourne as Miss Emily Goslett
 Christopher Beeny as Horatio Flynn
 Patrick Wells as Han 'Einstein' Boltz
 Ian Smith as Tom Chizzler
 Anneke Wills as Alice Nightingale
 Peter Martyn as P.C. Parker
 Dorothy Alison as Margery Chappel
 Ingeborg von Kusserow as Lea Blotz
 Carl Jaffe as Carl Blotz
 Ballard Berkeley as Dr. Nightingale
 Joan Young as Mrs. Chizzler
 Robert Raglan as Police Superintendent
 Barbara Hicks as Policewoman
 Jack May as Bob Crouch
 John Sharp as Police Sergeant Butler
 Peter Sallis as Bill
 Wyndham Goldie as Director Atomic Research

Production
Don Sharp had been in hospital for nearly two years with tuberculosis. When he came out, executives at Group 3 invited him to see if he had any ideas for a film and he pitched them Child's Play. He said Group 3's practice was to team an experienced producer with an inexperienced director so Herbert Mason was teamed with Margaret Thomson. Sharp called it "a good little picture" and he would work with Group Three on several more occasions.

References

External links

Child's Play at BFI
Child's Play at AllMovie

1954 films
British comedy films
Films produced by Herbert Mason
British science fiction films
1950s science fiction comedy films
1954 comedy films
Films scored by Antony Hopkins
1950s English-language films
British black-and-white films
1950s British films